The UEFA European Championship is the main football competition of the men's national football teams governed by UEFA (the Union of European Football Associations). Held every four years since 1960, in the even-numbered year between FIFA World Cup tournaments, it was originally called the UEFA European Nations' Cup, changing to the current name in 1968.

Starting with the 1996 tournament, specific championships are often referred to in the form "UEFA Euro XXXX". Prior to entering the tournament all teams other than the host nations (which qualify automatically) compete in a qualifying process.

Germany have participated in thirteen European Championships, five of which were as West Germany and eight of which were as (unified) Germany. They are also participating in the upcoming 2024 tournament as hosts. By doing so, the nation holds the record of most participations in the competition's history.

Germany are holders of three European titles, won in 1972 in Belgium, in 1980 in Italy, and in 1996 in England. The team have finished out of the top eight on only three occasions, in the 2000, 2004 and 2020 tournaments. They have reached at least the semi-finals on nine occasions, an unparalleled record in the competition.

Overall record

History
1960–1988 as 
1992–present as 
 Champions   Runners-up   Third place   Tournament played fully or partially on home soil

Winning campaigns

List of matches

UEFA Euro 1972

Final tournament

Semi-finals

Final

UEFA Euro 1976

Final tournament

Semi-finals

Final

UEFA Euro 1980

Group stage

Knockout stage

Final

UEFA Euro 1984

Group stage

UEFA Euro 1988

Group stage

Knockout stage

Semi-finals

UEFA Euro 1992

Group stage

Knockout stage

Semi-finals

Final

UEFA Euro 1996

Group stage

Knockout stage

Quarter-finals

Semi-finals

Final

UEFA Euro 2000

Group stage

UEFA Euro 2004

Group stage

UEFA Euro 2008

Group stage

Knockout phase

Quarter-finals

Semi-finals

Final

UEFA Euro 2012

Group stage

Knockout phase

Quarter-finals

Semi-finals

UEFA Euro 2016

Group stage

Knockout phase

Round of 16

Quarter-finals

Semi-finals

UEFA Euro 2020

Group stage

Knockout phase

Round of 16

Most appearances

Top goalscorers

References

Bibliography

 
Countries at the UEFA European Championship